The 2012–13 Meralco Bolts season was the third season of the franchise in the Philippine Basketball Association (PBA).

Key dates
August 19: The 2012 PBA Draft took place in Robinson's Midtown Mall, Manila.

Draft picks

Roster

Philippine Cup

Eliminations

Standings

Game log

|- bgcolor="#edbebf" 
| 1
|  October 5
|  Talk 'N Text
|  110–112*
|  Reyes (25)
|  Reyes (14)
|  Mercado, Ross (7)
|  Smart Araneta Coliseum
|  0–1
|  Boxscore
|- bgcolor="#bbffbb" 
| 2
|  October 10
|  Alaska
|  93–86
|  Hodge (20)
|  Hodge, Nabong (11)
|  Mercado (9)
|  Smart Araneta Coliseum
|  1–1
|  Boxscore
|- bgcolor="#bbffbb" 
| 3
|  October 13
|  Barangay Ginebra
|  95–88
|  Cardona (21)
|  Cardona (8)
|  Mercado (8)
|  Digos
|  2–1
|  Boxscore
|- bgcolor="#edbebf" 
| 4
|  October 17
|  GlobalPort
|  104–105
|  Mercado, Buenafe (30)
|  Hodge (15)
|  Mercado (8)
|  Mall of Asia Arena
|  2–2
|  Boxscore
|- bgcolor="#bbffbb" 
| 5
|  October 21
|  Air21
|  85–72
|  Mercado (24)
|  Reyes (14)
|  Hugnatan (3)
|  Mall of Asia Arena
|  3–2
|  Boxscore
|- bgcolor="#bbffbb"
| 6
|  October 31
|  Barako Bull
|  99–86
|  Mercado (22)
|  Borboran (7)
|  Mercado (6)
|  Smart Araneta Coliseum
|  4–2
|  Boxscore
|- bgcolor="#bbffbb"

|- bgcolor="#edbebf" 
| 7
|  November 4
|  Rain or Shine
|  81–106
|  Cardona (20)
|  Hodge (14)
|  Cardona (4)
|  Smart Araneta Coliseum
|  4–3
|  Boxscore
|- bgcolor="#bbffbb" 
| 8
|  November 11
|  Petron Blaze
|  95–81
|  Mercado, Hugnatan (22)
|  Cardona (9)
|  Cardona (10)
|  Mall of Asia Arena
|  5–3
|  Boxscore
|- bgcolor="#edbebf" 
| 9
|  November 16
|  Talk 'N Text
|  98–109
|  Mercado (28)
|  Hugnatan (10)
|  Mercado, Ross (6)
|  Ynares Center
|  5–4
|  Boxscore
|- bgcolor="#edbebf" 
| 10
|  November 21
|  Rain or Shine
|  98–102*
|  Mercado (28)
|  Reyes (9)
|  Mercado (7)
|  Smart Araneta Coliseum
|  5–5
|  Boxscore
|- bgcolor="#bbffbb" 
| 11
|  November 23
|  GlobalPort
|  101–92
|  Cardona (26)
|  Nabong (11)
|  Mercado (9)
|  Smart Araneta Coliseum
|  6–5
|  Boxscore
|- bgcolor="#edbebf" 
| 12
|  November 28
|  Alaska
|  85–88
|  Cardona, Ross (14)
|  Hodge (9)
|  Ross (10)
|  Smart Araneta Coliseum
|  6–6
|  Boxscore
|- bgcolor="#bbffbb" 
| 13
|  November 30
|  Barako Bull
|  85–73
|  Nabong (12)
|  Cardona (8)
|  Mercado (7)
|  Smart Araneta Coliseum
|  7–6
|  Boxscore
|-

|- bgcolor="#bbffbb" 
| 14
|  December 9
|  San Mig Coffee
|  87–77
|  Cardona, Hugnatan (15)
|  Reyes, Hodge, Hugnatan (9)
|  Mercado (5)
|  Smart Araneta Coliseum
|  8–7
|  Boxscore
|-

Playoffs

Bracket

Game log

|- bgcolor="#edbebf"  
| 1
|  December 12
|  Alaska
|  84–90
|  Mercado (22)
|  Reyes (21)
|  Mercado (6)
|  Smart Araneta Coliseum
|  0–1
|  Boxscore
|- bgcolor="#edbebf"  
| 2
|  December 14
|  Alaska
|  70–88
|  Cardona (18)
|  Hugnatan (9)
|  Mercado (10) 
|  Smart Araneta Coliseum
|  0–2
|  Boxscore

Commissioner's Cup

Eliminations

Standings

Game log

|- bgcolor="#bbffbb" 
| 1
|  February 9
|  Talk 'N Text
|  99–92
|  Dawson (37)
|  Dawson (14)
|  Ross (8)
|  Smart Araneta Coliseum
|  1–0
|  boxscore
|- bgcolor="#edbebf" 
| 2
|  February 13
|  Alaska
|  81–85
|  Manuel (18)
|  Dawson (13)
|  Artadi (4)
|  Smart Araneta Coliseum
|  1–1
|  boxscore
|- bgcolor="#edbebf" 
| 3
|  February 16
|  Rain or Shine
|  82–91
|  Dawson (21)
|  Dawson (12)
|  Ross (9)
|  Puerto Princesa City, Palawan
|  1–2
|  boxscore
|- bgcolor="#edbebf" 
| 4
|  February 20
|  Petron Blaze
|  86–88
|  Dawson (24)
|  Dawson (20)
|  Ross (6)
|  Smart Araneta Coliseum
|  1–3
|  boxscore
|- bgcolor="#bbffbb" 
| 5
|  February 24
|  GlobalPort
|  90–89
|  Salvacion (20)
|  Dawson (17)
|  Ross (17)
|  Smart Araneta Coliseum
|  2–3
|  boxscore
|-

|- bgcolor="#bbffbb" 
| 6
|  March 6
|  Air21
|  89–88
|  Dawson (35)
|  Dawson (17)
|  Ross (12)
|  Smart Araneta Coliseum
|  3–3
|  boxscore
|- 
| 7
|  March 13
|  Barako Bull
|  
|  
|  
|  
|  Smart Araneta Coliseum
|  
|  
|- 
| 8
|  March 15
|  San Mig Coffee
|  
|  
|  
|  
|  Smart Araneta Coliseum
|  
|  
|- 
| 9
|  March 22
|  Barangay Ginebra
|  
|  
|  
|  
|  Smart Araneta Coliseum
|  
|

Governors Cup

Eliminations

Standings

Game log

Transactions

Trades

Pre-season

Commissioner's Cup

Governors' Cup

Recruited imports

References

Meralco Bolts seasons
Meralco